is a Japanese photographer of the man-made environment, particularly sheds, alleys and night scenes.

Life and career
Nakazato was born in Taki, Mie Prefecture, Japan. When young he enjoyed painting, and he joined a painting club in Hosei University (Tokyo), from which he graduated in Geography. It was only when he was 25 that he first had any interest in photography, thinking that a SLR camera his grandmother had bought for him really ought to get some use, and enrolling in a photography class for the public that happened to be taught by Kazuo Kitai, whose teaching he found enormously stimulating. The classes were held once a week for two months, and Nakazato took seriously Kitai's casual answer that yes, he might be able to make it as a photographer. Nakazato would continue to meet Kitai once a month for two years thereafter.

Throughout this time Nakazato was supporting himself via as series of jobs that he disliked, and at 28 he determined that although the prospects of a good income looked bleak, he would indeed be a professional photographer as there was nothing other than photography that he wanted to do. He started with little skill or confidence (as he recalls) in editorial work for magazines, but gradually got into his stride and work picked up.

Nakazato's first photobook, published in 1991, is a portrayal of life on the "man-made wilderness" on the edges of Tokyo Bay, during its rapid changes before the construction of Makuhari Messe. The portraits (as well as the use of monochrome) make this book unusual among Nakazato's works, but it is highly regarded.

His subsequent work has been in colour, with one entire book (as well as major contributions to others) of photographs of sheds, books of photographs of dusk and night scenes in and near Tokyo done in collaboration with the writer Jun Nakano, and more.

In 2001, Nakazato was invited to participate in a crafts event in Ichikawa (Chiba), and, as a renowned photographer of sheds, quickly agreed to construct a shed, a job for which he had no experience. With the help of an architecture student from Waseda University, he was successful in what turned out to be the first of a series of sheds.

Nakazato won the Society of Photography Award in 2003 for his book De Chirico's Shadow and the Photo City Sagamihara newcomer's award in 2005 for his book Roji: Wandering Back Alleys.

Nakazato is a professor at Tokyo Zokei University. He also teaches various workshops elsewhere.

Exhibitions

Solo exhibitions

"Wangan gen'ya" (The man-made wilderness of Tokyo Bay). Olympus Gallery (Shinjuku, Tokyo), 1990.
"Yume no tezawari" (Touch of dreams). Nikon Salon (Shinjuku, Tokyo), 1995.
"Fūkei no achira: Miyazawa Kenji, Taneda Santōka no sekai o aruku" (Beyond scenes: Walking in the world of Kenji Miyazawa and Santōka Taneda). Konica Plaza (Shinjuku, Tokyo), 1996.
"Chihyō-e: jinettai" (Surface of the Earth picture: Terrestrial heat zone). Gallery Saoh & Tomos (Nihonbashi, Tokyo), 1996.
"Koya: Mushin de honpō na kenchiku" (Sheds: Innocent, wild construction). Inax Gallery (Nagoya), 1999. Inax Gallery (Tokyo and Osaka), 2000.
"Hyōsō seizō (ikon)" (The superficial: Icons from the deep). Exile Gallery (Kyoto), 2000.
"Kiriko no machi" (De Chirico's shadow). Uchida Gallery (Azabu Jūban, Tokyo).
"Yami no hyōkai" / "Rising Darkness". Il Tempo (Kōenji, Tokyo), 2004.
"Koya no shōzō". Jikonka (Kameyama, Mie), 2004.
"N machi" (N town). Uchida Gallery (Kayabachō, Tokyo), 2005. Variété Honroku (Hongō, Tokyo), 2006.
"Tōkei". Mokudosui Gallery (Koshigaya, Saitama), 2006.
"R". Gallery Tosei (Nakano, Tokyo), 2006.
"Koya-tachi no hitorigoto" (Monologues of sheds). Billiken Gallery (Aoyama, Tokyo), 2007.
"Self-build". Roba Roba Cafe (Tokyo), 2008.
"Nacht. Natur. Das andere Tokio" / "Yoru, shizen, mō hitotsu no Tōkyō" (Night, nature, another Tokyo). Stadtteilarchiv Ottensen (Altona, Hamburg), 2008. Contemporary Art Factory (Mukōjima, Tokyo), 2008.
"Ultra rinkai yakei" (Ultra: Nightscape of critical area). C Square Gallery, Chukyo University (Nagoya), 2008. Mie Prefectural Art Museum (Tsu, Mie), 2009–2010
"Ultra". Aoyama Book Center Gallery (Aoyama, Tokyo), 2009.
"Fūkei no kyōkai 1983–2010" / "Boundary in Landscape". Yoshizawa Garden Gallery (Ichikawa, Chiba), 2010.

Group exhibitions
"Bokutō shashinten" (Bokuto photograph exhibition). Warehouse in Kinshichō (Tokyo), 2006.
"Mieru mono / mienai mono" / "The photograph: What You See and What You Don't". Chinretsukan gallery, Tokyo National University of Fine Arts and Music, 2007.
"Funagoya: Fūdo to katachi" / "Topography of Japanese Boathouses". Inax Gallery (Tokyo, Osaka, Nagoya), 2007.
"Ishi wa kirei, ishi wa fushigi: Tsugaru" / "Rocks are Beautiful, Rocks are Mysterious: Tsugaru, Land of Amazing Rocks." Inax Gallery (Tokyo, Osaka, Nagoya), 2007–2008. Rock formations, rocks, polished rocks and rock details in Tsugaru.
"Tsuchi: Daichi no chikara" (Strength of the Earth). Gunma Museum of Art, Tatebayashi, 2008.
"Gazai to sozai no hikidashi hakubutsukan" (Drawer museum of art tools and materials). Meguro Museum of Art (Meguro, Tokyo), 2008.
"Bakumatsu no tankenka: Matsuura Takeshirō to ichijōshiki" / "The One-Mat Study of Takeshiro Matsuura, 19th Century Explorer". Inax Gallery (Tokyo, Osaka, Nagoya), 2010. On the explorer and cartographer Matsuura Takeshirō.

Publications

Books by Nakazato

 Wangan gen'ya / The Man-Made Wilderness of Tokyo Bay 1983–1989. Tokyo: Rokkō Shuppan, 1991. . Black-and-white photographs of life at the edges of Tokyo Bay. (All of Nakazato's subsequent books are of colour photographs.)
 Koya no shōzō / Portraits of Sheds. Tokyo: Media Factory, 2000. . Photographs of the outsides of home-made sheds of all kinds across Japan. Captions and texts in both Japanese and English.
 Kiriko no machi / De Chirico's Shadow. Wides Photo Collection 12. Tokyo: Wides, 2002. . Photographs of places and architectural and other detail, in daylight and at night. Captions and short text in both Japanese and English.
 Roji / Roji: Wandering Back Alleys. Tokyo: Seiryū Shuppan, 2004. . Photographs of back alleys across Japan. Text and captions are in Japanese only.
 R. Tokyo: Tōseisha, 2006. . Paired photographs of bends in roads across Japan. Captions (locations and dates) in English, short text in Japanese.
 Tōkei / Tokyo Mukojima 2000–2006. Koshigaya: Mokudosui, 2006. . Photographs of Mukōjima by day and night. No captions; an afterword in both English and Japanese.
 Yotsu no machi / Geography of Colors. Tokyo: Seiryū Shuppan, 2007. . Pastel colours of the Ryūkyū islands, black of Mie and Aichi, the bright colours of Aomori, and the white of Japan in the snow. Captions in Japanese only but an afterword in both Japanese and English.
 Ultra. Tokyo: Nippon Camera-sha, 2008. . Photographs taken at night. Captions in Roman script, and (minimal) text in both Japanese and English.

Book collaborations
 Iwate-ken Poran-chō aza nanatsu mori e: Miyazawa Kenji e no tabi. Tokyo: Kaiseisha, 1995. . Text by Takao Wajun. A travel guide to and picture book of Iwate (and particularly Morioka and Hanamaki), inspired by and linked to the travels of Kenji Miyazawa. In Japanese only.
 Nukemichi, yorimichi, Santōka: Kyūshū o meguru tabi. Tokyo: Kaiseisha, 1995. Text by Takao Wajun. . A travel guide to and picture book of Kyūshū, inspired by and linked to the travels of Santōka Taneda. In Japanese only.
 Nihonjin ni aitai: Tazune aruita 34-nin no shōzō. Tokyo: Art Digest, 1999. . Text by Hidetoshi Matsui. The title means "I/we want to meet (some) Japanese people: Portraits of 34 people I/we went around to meet". Matsui interviews the 34 people – photographers, scholars, musicians, and so forth – and for each, Nakazato supplies four or so black-and-white photographs: some of them fairly straightforward portraits, but others showing the person at work.
Koya: Hataraku kenchiku. Tokyo: Inax, 1991. . By Nakazato, Kunihiro Andō and Toshikatsu Ue. The title means "Sheds: Working architecture". More than half of this lavishly illustrated book about sheds consists of colour and black-and-white photographs and text by Nakazato; many of the photographs later reappear in Portraits of Sheds.
 Tōkaidō gojūsan tsugi kikō: Yonhyakunen kaidō no dorama. Tokyo: Moku Shuppan, 2001. . Text by Hiroshi Takada.
Koya no chikara / Micro Architecture. Tokyo: World Photo Press, 2001. . Ed Kiyoko Senba and Kesaharu Imai. Nakazato is one of numerous contributors to this large anthology about sheds. Despite its English alternative title, in Japanese only.
 Ouma ga toki / Dusk: Before Night Falls. Tokyo: Pie, 2003. . Text by Jun Nakano. Color photographs of dusk. Biographical and other information in both Japanese and English, but the main texts in Japanese only.
 Inochi: Shiage no mei-serifu. Tokyo: Shōgakukan, 2003. . Ed. Chōkitsu Kurumatani.
 Nagaya meiro / Row House Maze. Tokyo: Pie, 2004. . Colour photographs of nagaya in Sumida (Tokyo). Text by Jun Nakano. Most of the text is in Japanese only, but there is a little in English.
 Yotabi. Tokyo: Kawade Shobō Shinsha, 2005. . Text by Jun Nakano.
Funagoya: Fūdo to katachi / Topography of Japanese Boathouses. Tokyo: Inax, 2007. . Photographs by Nakazato. The book of the 2007 exhibition.
 Tokyo: Exploring the City of the Shogun. Tokyo: Kodansha International, 2007. . Text (in English only) by Sumiko Enbutsu. A lavishly illustrated tourist souvenir cum guide to seven suggested walks around Tokyo, concentrating on areas that are older or that have historical significance.
 Ishi wa kirei, ishi wa fushigi: Tsugaru / Rocks are Beautiful, Rocks are Mysterious: Tsugaru, Land of Amazing Rocks. Tokyo: Inax, 2007. . Text by Hidemichi Hori, Shin'ichi Nakazawa, Hikaru Okuizumi and Nakazato; photographs by Nakazato. The book of the 2007–2008 exhibition.
 Koya-tachi no hitori-goto. Tokyo: Billiken Shuppan, 2007. . Text by Shuntarō Tanikawa. A picture book for children, with Nakazato's photographs of sheds.
 Tōkyō saihate kankō. Tokyo: Kōtsū Shinbunsha, 2008. . Text by Jun Nakano. The title means something like "tourism in the farthest reaches of Tokyo"; the book is a guide to small, quirky areas at the edge of the megalopolis rather than administrative area, for example reaching northward to Shibukawa at the edge of the Kantō plain. The photographs are black-and-white and colour, of day and night scenes.
 Self-build: Jibun de ie o tateru to iu koto. Tokyo: Kōtsū Shinbunsha, 2008. . Text by Osamu Ishiyama. A book showing how to build one's own house.
Bakumatsu no tankenka: Matsuura Takeshirō to ichijōshiki / The One-Mat Study of Takeshiro Matsuura, 19th Century Explorer. Tokyo: Inax, 2010. . On Matsuura Takeshirō. Text by various people. The book of the 2010 exhibition.

Other collaborations
Roba no oto sagashi. Kromhoorn Records, 1998. Nakazato provides the photographs for the booklet.
Aoi yoru no tabi: Tankinshō II / Pale Night Trip: Tan Kin Sho II. OCM Records, 2007. Music by Shunsuke Mizuno, photographs by Nakazato.
Yoru e ikou. May 2008 issue of the magazine Takusan no fushigi. Tokyo: Fukuinkan, 2008. Text by Jun Nakano, photographs by Nakazato, for this issue of a monthly scientific magazine for children.

Notes

References

External links
 Nakazato's site 
 Profile of Nakazato at Contemporary Art Factory. 
 On the series R. Tamron. 
 Article on the series Tōkei, Asahi Camera, September 2007. 
 2003 interview with Nakazato. 
 2006 interview with Nakazato. 

Artists from Mie Prefecture
Hosei University alumni
Japanese photographers
Academic staff of Tokyo Zokei University
Photography academics
1956 births
Living people